Hixon is an unincorporated community at the northern edge of the Cariboo region of the Central Interior region of British Columbia, Canada. It is part of Electoral Area E in the Regional District of Fraser-Fort George. It is located on the east (left) bank of the Fraser River, and is about midway along BC Highway 97 between the cities of Prince George (N) and Quesnel (S).  It was named for Hixon Creek, which in turn is named for a 19th-century prospector in the area, by the name of Joseph Foster Hixon, who found gold here on the banks of the Fraser River back around 1866.

Climate

References

Unincorporated settlements in British Columbia
Populated places on the Fraser River
Geography of the Cariboo
Designated places in British Columbia